Qatar competed at the 1988 Summer Olympics in Seoul, South Korea.

Competitors
The following is the list of number of competitors in the Games.

Results by event

Athletics
Men's 10,000 metres
 Ahmed Ebrahim Warsama
 Heat – 29:37.99 (→ did not advance)

References

Official Olympic Reports
sports-reference

Nations at the 1988 Summer Olympics
1988
Olympics